Maple Avenue Historic District is a national historic district located at Elmira, Chemung County, New York.  It encompasses 121 contributing buildings and four contributing objects in a predominantly residential section of Elmira.  It developed between about 1869 and 1940, and includes notable examples of Italianate, Second Empire, Queen Anne, Colonial Revival, and American Craftsman style architecture.  Located in the district are the separately listed John Brand Jr. House, John Brand Sr. House, and Alexander Eustace House. Other notable buildings are the J.H. Harris House (1892), Samuel W. Clark House (c. 1869), James H. Clark House (c. 1869), and Horace W. Personius House (1913).

It was added to the National Register of Historic Places in 2013.

References

Historic districts on the National Register of Historic Places in New York (state)
Italianate architecture in New York (state)
Second Empire architecture in New York (state)
Queen Anne architecture in New York (state)
Colonial Revival architecture in New York (state)
Buildings and structures in Chemung County, New York
National Register of Historic Places in Chemung County, New York